The Four Fords were a group of American dancers in the early 1900s. The group was composed of four siblings, Max , Edwin\, Dora and Mabel Ford.

The Ford children learned to dance at an early age. (Mable Ford).  At some point, the children became a vaudeville dance act.(Watson). They clog danced, tap danced, and soft shoe danced (An Art of Infinite Variety).  The Four Fords became popular around 1910.  Over the next three years, they toured in England, the Netherlands, Ireland, and Germany.

In 1913, the Four Fords broke up.  Mable and Dora toured as the Ford Sisters. Max Ford toured with Hetty Urma-Ford, his second wife (Watson). It is believed that Max became a movie choreographer.

References 

“An Art of Infinite Variety: Vaudeville’s Dance Glides From the Oriental to the Ballet to the Naïve Strut”. 1924. Poster.
archive.itvs.org. JUBA: Tap History. n.d. Web. <https://web.archive.org/web/20160304025421/http://archive.itvs.org/juba/tap.html>
Internet Movie Database. Dora Ford. n.d. Web. <https://www.imdb.com/name/nm0285619/bio>
—. Mable Ford. n.d. Web. <https://www.imdb.com/name/nm0285762/bio>
Kaiserman, Beth. From Master Juba to ‘Happy Feet’: A Brief History of Tap Dancing. 31 December 2012. Web. <http://highbrowmagazine.com/1896-master-juba-happy-feet-brief-history-tap-dancing>
Watson, Sonny. The Four Fords. n.d. Web. 25 February 2013.Web. <http://www.streetswing.com/histmai2/d2four_fords1.htm>

American dance groups
American tap dancers